Glyptophidium is a genus of cusk-eels.

Species
There are currently seven recognized species in this genus:
 Glyptophidium argenteum Alcock, 1889
 Glyptophidium effulgens J. G. Nielsen & Machida, 1988
 Glyptophidium japonicum Kamohara, 1936 (Japanese cusk)
 Glyptophidium longipes Norman, 1939 (Bigeye brotula)
 Glyptophidium lucidum H. M. Smith & Radcliffe, 1913 (Sculptured cusk)
 Glyptophidium macropus Alcock, 1894
 Glyptophidium oceanium H. M. Smith & Radcliffe, 1913

References

Ophidiidae